Southern Style is the fifth studio album and fourth in the country genre by American artist Darius Rucker. It was released on March 31, 2015, by Capitol Records Nashville. The album's lead single, "Homegrown Honey", was released to country radio on August 25, 2014. The album's second single, the title track was released to country radio on May 4, 2015. The album won International Album of the Year at the British Country Music Association Awards.

Background
News about Rucker's working on his fourth country release was first announced in August 2014. Sixty songs were written for the album then with twelve to fifteen of them being cut for the record. Once again Rucker worked with record producer, Frank Rogers on the album. On working with Rogers, Rucker says, "I can't go in to record with the attitude that I want to sound different. It's all about the songs for me. I want great songs. And if we have great songs, then Frank is the genius and does what he does." When Rucker was visiting The Tonight Show Starring Jimmy Fallon on January 12, 2015, he announced that his new album would be called Southern Style, as well as the release date, and tour to support the album.

Commercial performance
The album debuted at No. 1 on the Top Country Albums, his fourth No. 1 on the chart. It also debuted on Billboard 200 at No. 7, with 52,000 copies sold in the US for the week. As of September 2016 the album has sold 199,000 copies in the United States.

Track listing

Personnel

 David Angell – violin
 Blake Bollinger – background vocals
 Pat Buchanan – slide guitar
 J.T. Corenflos – electric guitar
 Eric Darken – percussion
 David Davidson – violin
 Drew Davis – background vocals
 Shannon Forrest – drums
 Aubrey Haynie – fiddle, mandolin
 Wes Hightower – background vocals
 Mallary Hope – vocals on "Baby I'm Right"
 Mike Johnson – dobro, pedal steel guitar
 Anthony LaMarchina – cello
 Andy Leftwich – fiddle, mandolin
 Brent Mason – acoustic guitar, slide guitar 
 Greg Morrow – drums
 Gordon Mote – Hammond B-3 organ, keyboards, piano, Wurlitzer
 Danny Rader – acoustic guitar, electric guitar
 Michael Rhodes – bass guitar
 Rich Robinson – slide guitar on "Southern Style"
 Frank Rogers – electric guitar, piano
 Darius Rucker – lead vocals
 Bryan Sutton – banjo, acoustic guitar
 Russell Terrell – background vocals
 Bobby Terry – acoustic guitar
 Derek Wells – electric guitar
 Kristin Wilkinson – string arrangements, viola
 Glenn Worf – bass guitar

Chart performance

Weekly charts

Year-end charts

Singles

Release history

References

2015 albums
Capitol Records albums
Darius Rucker albums
Albums produced by Frank Rogers (record producer)